Pesawaran Regency is a regency (kabupaten) of Lampung Province, Sumatra, Indonesia.  It covers an area of 1,173.77 km2, and had a population of 398,848 at the 2010 Census and 477,468 at the 2020 Census; the official estimate as at mid 2021 was 481,708. The regency seat is the town of Gedong Tataan. This regency was formerly part of South Lampung Regency from which it was separated in 2007.

Administrative districts
Administratively at 2010 the regency was divided into seven districts (kecamatan). However, since 2010 four new districts have been created from parts of existing districts, bringing the total to eleven districts. The four new districts were Marga Punduh, Teluk Pandan, Way Ratai and Way Khilau. The eleven districts are tabulated below with their areas and their areas and their populations at the 2010 Census and the 2020 Census, together with the official estimates as at mid 2021. The table also includes the locations of the district administrative centres, the number of administrative villages (rural desa and urban kelurahan) in each district and its post code. 

Notes: (a) the district includes 30 islands off the south coast of Sumatra, the largest being Pulau Legundi and Pulau Siancal. (b) the population of the new Marga Punduh District at the 2010 census is included in the figure for the Punduh Pidada District from which it was separated on 18 November 2014. (c) the district includes 7 islands off the south coast of Sumatra. (d) the populations of the new Teluk Pandan and Wai Ratai Districts at the 2010 census are included in the figure for the Padang Cermin District from which they were separated on 18 November 2014. (e) the population of the new Wai Lima District at the 2010 census is included in the figure for the Wai Khilau District from which it was separated on 18 November 2014.

History
In September 2010, a number of people in Umbul Baru were rushed to a community health center after consuming water poisoned by industrial waste which was allegedly dumped in the Cikantor River by the gold mining company PT Napal Umbar Picung (NUP).

References

Regencies of Lampung